Paul Jules Barbier (8 March 182516 January 1901) was a French poet, writer and opera librettist who often wrote in collaboration with Michel Carré. He was a noted Parisian bon vivant and man of letters.

Works 
His libretti for extant operas (those co-written with Carré are shown with an asterisk) include:
Charles Gounod:
La Colombe, Faust (*), Le médecin malgré lui (*), Philémon et Baucis, Polyeucte, La reine de Saba and Roméo et Juliette (*)
Victor Massé:
Galathée
Les Saisons (*)
 Giacomo Meyerbeer:
Le pardon de Ploërmel (later revised as Dinorah)
Jacques Offenbach:
The Tales of Hoffmann
Camille Saint-Saëns:
Le timbre d'argent
Ambroise Thomas:
Hamlet (*), Mignon (*) and Françoise de Rimini (*).

He also wrote the libretto for La Guzla de l'Émir, a one-act comic opera by Georges Bizet.  This was never performed and probably destroyed.

He wrote the scenario for Léo Delibes' ballet Sylvia. Charles Gounod wrote incidental music to Barbier's play Jeanne d'Arc, and the libretto to Pyotr Ilyich Tchaikovsky's opera The Maid of Orleans was partially based on it.

See also

Ballets by Jules Barbier
Libretti by Jules Barbier

References

External links
Polyeucte : opéra in quatre actes / paroles de Jules Barbier et Michel Carré; partition, piano et chant réduite par H. Salomon, opera vocal scores with piano from the Sibley Music Library Digital Score Collection
Reine de Saba. Inspirez-moi, race divine. Vocal score. English & French from the Sibley Music Library Digital Score Collection

1825 births
1901 deaths
19th-century French dramatists and playwrights
19th-century French poets
French ballet librettists
French opera librettists
Officiers of the Légion d'honneur
Writers from Paris